Bagdogra Airport  also known as the Siliguri International Airport is a customs airport serving the city of Siliguri and northern West Bengal, India.
It is operated as a civil enclave at Bagdogra Air Force Station of the Indian Air Force. It is the gateway to the hill stations of Darjeeling, Gangtok, Kurseong, Kalimpong, Mirik and other parts of North Bengal region. As a major transport hub in the region, the airport sees thousands of tourists annually. The Government of India conferred limited international airport status to the airport in 2002 with limited international operations to Bangkok–Suvarnabhumi and Paro. This is the second busiest airport in West Bengal.

The airport experiences humid subtropical climate (Köppen Climate Classification code: Cwa) - hot humid summers and cool winters. There is significant precipitation in all seasons, but remains drier in winters. Air traffic at Bagdogra crossed 1 million for the first time, growing at 43.6% percent in 2014–15. In 2019–20, the airport served 3.2 million passengers, which was an increase of 11.2% from the previous year, making it the 17th-busiest airport in India. It is one of the few airports in India with zero sales tax on aviation turbine fuel.

Air Force Station

The airbase is home to the IAF No. 20 Wing, as also to the Mikoyan-Gurevich MiG-21 (Mig-21) FL fighter aircraft of the No. 8 Squadron and a Helicopter Unit. Along with the airbase at Hasimara, Alipurduar district; it is responsible for combat air operations over a large area including North Bengal, Sikkim, and if needed, Bhutan. The base caters to all military air traffic for the Indian Army's XXXIII Corps based nearby in Sukna.

Expansion
AAI also expanded the apron at the same time, enabling the parking of 5 narrow body aircraft simultaneously. The IAF, which maintains the ATC and runway, gave permission for night landings by civilian aircraft allowing flights past 6 pm in 2013. The new terminal building, which will start its construction by December 2022, will be completed by June 2025 with 16 parking bays, 10 aerobridges and a parallel taxiway to the runway. It will have a floor area of 1 lakh sq.m. at a cost of ₹ 1,884 crore, and will be capable of handling 12.5 million passengers per year. After the expansion of the airport, more international flights can land here, and will turn this customs airport into an international one. For its growing traffic over the years, in 2022, From 11 to 25 April, the airport was shut down for 14 days to refurbish its sole runway.

Airlines and destinations

Statistics

Accidents and incidents 

 23 May 2008: A MiG-21 of the Indian Air Force had to perform a belly landing due to a technical snag and a jammed landing gear. The aircraft hard landed on the runway causing it to catch fire. The pilot ejected safely. The aircraft was written off subsequently.
 5 July 2013: AI879, an A320 arriving from New Delhi swerved off the taxiway while taxiing towards the apron after landing. No injuries were reported. The passengers were immediately de-boarded. The aircraft sustained minor damage and took about 7 hours to bring the stuck aircraft to the taxiway.
11 July 2014: A mishap was avoided between IndiGo flight 6E472 and Air India flight AI879. Both aircraft received a Traffic Collision Avoidance System warning. Following the Resolution Advisory given by the TCAS the IndiGo flight immediately descended and the Air India flight turned right. Both aircraft landed safely without any injuries.
 15 February 2019: An Air Asia India A320 scheduled for a  flight from Bagdogra Airport to Kempegowda International Airport damaged its left wing sharklets while backtracking the runway. The two pilots were later suspended for 6 months by the DGCA in view of violating laid down procedures.
 16 December 2019: An IndiGo A320neo bound for Kolkata performed an emergency landing in view of engine related issues. The aircraft was using Pratt & Whitney engines. Out of the two engines, one engine was not modified which caused the issue.

References

External links
 Bagdogra Airport at Airports Authority of India website.

Buildings and structures in Darjeeling district
Transport in Jalpaiguri district
Airports in West Bengal
Transport in Siliguri
Airports with year of establishment missing